Lee J. Slavutin is an entrepreneur, author and speaker in the areas of life insurance and financial planning.

He was born in Melbourne, Australia, in 1951 to a Jewish family. He trained as a medical doctor with a specialization in pathology, and practiced pathology at Lenox Hill Hospital from 1979 to 1982. In 1983, Slavutin changed careers to become a life insurance advisor. He is the co-founder of Stern Slavutin 2, Inc., which provides life insurance and estate planning advisement in New York City. He is also a Jewish scholar.

Slavutin has served as director of the Estate Planning Council of New York and was inducted into the Estate Planning Hall of Fame in 2014 by the National Association of Estate Planners and Councils. He is also an Insurance Expert for the publication Bottom Line/Personal.

He is the author of A Guide to Life Insurance Strategies, an accounting textbook. Slavutin has written articles for Stephan Leimberg’s LISI Newsletter, as well as for Financial Advisor Magazine, ''Financial and Estate Planning, and Practitioners Publishing Company.

In 1990, Slavutin testified for the New York State Senate, and in 1994 he worked with the United States General Accounting Office to evaluate insurance company rating firms.

References

Living people
1951 births
Australian pathologists
Australian economists
Medical doctors from Melbourne
Religious leaders from Melbourne
Australian Jews